Nusrat Thakur (1937 – 6 November 2009) was a Pakistani television, PTV director and producer. He was the producer of some of the most successful TV dramas like Waris (serial) and Dehleez.

Early life and career
Nusrat Thakur was born at Lahore, British India in 1937. His father's name was M.J. Thakur who was a radio personality. Nusrat Thakur started his career at Radio Pakistan in the 1960s. Later he started his television career by assisting noted PTV producer and director Yawar Hayat Khan in the 1970s, followed by producing and directing TV dramas independently. He retired as General Manager of PTV, Lahore in the 1990s after a service of 40 years with this Pakistani television.

Death and legacy
Nusrat Thakur died of cardiac arrest on 6 November 2009 at Lahore after a brief illness. He had been diabetic for some time and that had led to some other complications in the past. Among his survivors are his wife, a son and a daughter. Nusrat Thakur was against the glamourisation of women or expensive and grand TV sets. Instead he brought a certain degree of realism into all his TV plays.

TV Dramas

Most of Nusrat Thakur's directed TV plays were written by Amjad Islam Amjad and Asghar Nadeem Syed

 Waris (1979)
 Dehleez (1980s)
 Waqt
 Samundar
 Raat
 Piyas
 Duniya (1990s) 
 Eendhan (1990s) 
 Ghulam Gardish (1998)
 Tawan (Early 2000s)

References

External links
Nusrat Thakur on IMDb website

1937 births
2009 deaths
People from Lahore
Pakistani television producers
Pakistani television directors
Pakistan Television Corporation people
Pakistan Television Corporation executives
Punjabi people